"You're in My Heart (The Final Acclaim)" is a song written and recorded by Rod Stewart for his 1977 album Foot Loose & Fancy Free. The song become a hit, reaching the top ten of many countries, including the United States (number 4), Canada (number 2), and Australia, peaking at number 1 for one week.

The lyrics mention two of Stewart's favourite football teams in the phrase "Celtic, United". The inner sleeve to the album Foot Loose & Fancy Free also pictures artwork with the names Glasgow Celtic and Manchester United drifting out of a car stereo.

Reception
Billboard declared that "You're in My Heart" should become "Stewart's biggest easy listening hit" and felt the vocal style was similar to that of "The Killing of Georgie".  Record World said that "it's slow, introspective, the story of a relationship many should recognize."

Personnel
 Rod Stewart – vocals
 Jim Cregan – guitars, backing vocals
 Phil Chen – bass
 Carmine Appice – drums, backing vocals
 John Barlow Jarvis – Fender Rhodes electric piano
 Fred Tackett – acoustic guitar
 Nicky Hopkins – string synthesizer
 Richard Greene – violin

Chart performance

Weekly charts

Year-end charts

Certifications

References

External links
 

Rod Stewart songs
1977 singles
Number-one singles in Australia
RPM Top Singles number-one singles
Pop ballads
Songs written by Rod Stewart
Music videos directed by Bruce Gowers
1977 songs
Warner Records singles
Song recordings produced by Tom Dowd
1970s ballads